Sandra R. Williams is a former Democratic member of the Ohio Senate who served the 21st district from 2015 to 2022. She also formerly served in the Ohio House of Representatives from 2007 to 2014. Her district includes the eastern two-thirds of Cleveland, as well as the east-side suburbs of Bratenahl, Cleveland Heights, Garfield Heights, Newburgh Heights, Shaker Heights and University Heights.

Early life and education 
A native of Cleveland, Williams attended Cleveland State University and Tiffin University.

Career 
Williams worked in the field of criminal justice as a corrections officer, probation officer, parole officer and mediator. Williams also served as a member of the United States Army Reserve from 1987 to 1995. Williams also worked within the Statehouse as a legislative aide for her predecessor in the Ohio House of Representatives, Annie L. Key.

Ohio House of Representatives 
After Key decided not seek reelection in 2006, Williams ran for the safely Democratic seat. She won the Democratic Primary with 30.38% of the vote in a field of six candidates, and was unopposed in the November general election. In 2008, Williams was unopposed in the March Democratic Primary and won the general election with 85.45% of the vote against Republican Rosalind McAllister.

In 2009, Williams was elected President of the Ohio Legislative Black Caucus, and continued to serve in that capacity through the 130th General Assembly. Speaker Armond Budish also named Williams as Chairman of the Economic Development Committee for the 128th General Assembly. She also served as Vice Chairman of the Public Utilities Committee.

In 2010, Williams was again unopposed in the March Democratic Primary and again defeated challenger Rosalind McAllister with 82.24% of the vote. Williams won election to a final term in 2012 by defeating challenger Tony Perry in the primary with 81.07% of the vote.  She was unopposed in the general election.

On October 31, 2014, Williams pleaded no-contest in Franklin County Municipal Court to two first-degree misdemeanor charges: one count of illegal conversion of campaign funds and one count of filing a false report. The charges pertained to her having, in 2010, sold Ohio State University football tickets that had been purchased with campaign funds to an associate, retained the proceeds for personal use, and failed to properly report the transaction on her campaign finance reports. The illegal activity was discovered as a consequence of an FBI investigation of payday lending lobbying activity at the Ohio Statehouse. Prior to her conviction, Williams voluntarily reimbursed her campaign for the value of the tickets.  In early December 2014, Williams was fined $2000 after having been found guilty of both charges.

Ohio Senate
In 2014, Williams faced term limits in the House and decided to run for the Ohio Senate to replace Senator Shirley Smith, who was also term-limited. In the Democratic primary, Williams pulled 84.45% of the vote in a three-way race, and went on to win the general election with 86% of the vote.

As a member of the Senate, Williams is serving on a new task force seeking to improve relations between Ohio communities and their police departments, formed by Ohio Governor John Kasich.

She resigned from the Ohio Senate on June 1, 2022 and took a job in the private sector.

Mayoral campaign

In May 2021, Williams announced her candidacy in the upcoming Cleveland mayoral election after incumbent Mayor Frank G. Jackson announced his retirement. In the September 14 primary, Williams was eliminated after placing in 6th with just over 11% of the vote. Williams was the only female candidate in the race, and if elected would have been the first African-American Woman to serve as Mayor of Cleveland.

Policy and positions
Williams has been a vocal critic of Governor John Kasich's lack of diversity upon choosing his cabinet, stating, "I would hope that Kasich would understand that this state is very diverse.... African-Americans, as well as other minorities, make up a significant portion of the state's population and his cabinet, as well as his staff, should reflect that." She also has stated that there is a "strong possibility" that Gov. Kasich and the GOP controlled legislature would curtail efforts to expand minority business contracting.

A staunch opponent of collective bargaining reform brought forth in S.B. 5, Williams believes that Republicans could risk defeat if the continue with the bill.

As chairperson of the Legislative Black Caucus, Williams was vocal about a controversial initiative that would require a photo ID to cast a ballot. Williams believes that doing so would "disenfranchise" minority voters from participating in an election. She has called it an intentional attack on the Democratic Party.

In April, 2011, Williams made news when citizens concerned about Governor Kasich's proposed budget tried to visit legislators' Columbus offices and were stopped by state troopers and a police dog.  Williams, who had an appointment scheduled with the group, said the dog was unnecessary and intimidating.

In one of her first initiatives in the Senate, Williams has proposed workforce training measures.

Electoral history

References

External links
Senator Sandra Williams (D-Cleveland)
The Ohio Ladies' Gallery: Rep. Sandra Williams (D-Cleveland)
Project Vote Smart - Representative Sandra Williams (OH) profile
Follow the Money - Sandra Williams
2006 campaign contributions

Democratic Party members of the Ohio House of Representatives
Living people
Cleveland State University alumni
Tiffin University alumni
Women state legislators in Ohio
Democratic Party Ohio state senators
Politicians from Cleveland
African-American women in politics
Year of birth missing (living people)
African-American state legislators in Ohio
Candidates in the 2021 United States elections
21st-century American politicians
21st-century American women politicians
21st-century African-American women
21st-century African-American politicians